Mohammad Sayeem is a first-class and List A cricketer from Bangladesh, who played 4 first-class matches and two one day games for Barisal Division in 2001 and 2002. His best first-class bowling, 2 for 59, came in a clash against Dhaka Division.

References 

Barisal Division cricketers
Bangladeshi cricketers
Living people
Year of birth missing (living people)